Great Brook may refer to the following:

Great Brook (Cold River), a tributary in New Hampshire
Great Brook (New Jersey), a tributary of the Passaic River